Rheon James (born 21 September 1992) is a Welsh rugby union player who plays for Cornish Pirates as a centre. James previously played for Carmarthen Quins and the Scarlets before joining the Pirates, and he is also a former Wales U20 international.

References

Cornish Pirates players
Scarlets players
1992 births
Living people